Lake Mirror, an egg shaped lake has a surface area of . Lake Mirror is in a highly urbanized area. Other than on its northeast shore, it is surrounded by residences.

There is no public access to the shores of Lake Mirror. However, boats may reach Lake Mirror from a canal connecting it to Lake Cannon. Another canal connects it to Spring Lake. This lake is part of the south system of the Winter Haven Chain of Lakes, so it may be reached by boats coming from a number of public boat ramps in the system.  The Hook and Bullet website says Lake Mirror contains largemouth bass, bluegill and crappie.

References

Mirror
Winter Haven, Florida